Dream Police is the fourth studio album by American rock band Cheap Trick. It was released in 1979, and was their third release in a row produced by Tom Werman. It is the band's most commercially successful studio album, going to No. 6 on the Billboard 200 chart and being certified platinum within a few months of its release.

Overview
Dream Police shows the band expanding into longer, more complex songs and incorporating orchestration on several tracks. Three videos were produced: "Dream Police", "Way of the World" and "Voices". The album had been completed by early-1979, but its release was pushed back several months due to the surprise success of Cheap Trick at Budokan.

The album's title track became a Top 30 hit for the band. "Voices" was also a hit for the band, reaching No. 32 on the Billboard chart. "Voices" has been used twice in the soundtrack of the American sitcom How I Met Your Mother.

Near the end of "Gonna Raise Hell" the orchestra is citing a snippet from "Heaven Tonight". That song was described by Allmusic critic Tom Maginnis as having an "extended, disco-inflected, slowburn groove".

Variations
In 2010, Cheap Trick re-recorded the title track as "Green Police" for the controversial Green Police advertisement which aired during Super Bowl XLIV for Audi.

Track listing
All songs written by Rick Nielsen, except where noted.

The bonus tracks of the 2006 reissue of Dream Police consisted mainly of rare live versions of songs from the album. "I Know What I Want" is noteworthy for being the b-side to their 1988 single "Don't Be Cruel" and the only non-live track is a demo of the title track without its trademark strings.

Singles
 1979: "Dream Police" b/w "Heaven Tonight" – #26 US, #4 Canada, #79 Japan
 1979: "Voices" b/w "Surrender" (Live) – #16 Australia (UK)
 1979: "Voices" b/w "The House Is Rockin' (With Domestic Problems)" – #32 US, #12 Canada,(US & Canada)
 1980: "Way of the World" b/w "Oh Candy" – #73 UK
 1980: "I'll Be with You Tonight" b/w "He's a Whore" & "So Good to See You" (UK)

Unreleased outtakes
 "It Must Be Love" (This song was given to Rick Derringer who covered it on his 1979 album Guitars and Women)
 "Next Position Please" (Features Robin, Rick, and Tom on vocals, later re-recorded for the 1983 album of the same name)
 "See Me Now" ("Way of the World" with alternate lyrics)
 "Way of the World" (with Rick Nielsen on vocals)
 "I Know What I Want" (with Robin Zander on vocals)

Covers
 Sam Kinison covered "Gonna Raise Hell" on his comedy album Leader of the Banned.
 Heavy Metal/Prog rocker Rob Gravelle released both regular and extended versions of the title track.  The latter included a long outro guitar solo.

Personnel

Cheap Trick
 Robin Zander – lead vocals, rhythm guitar
 Rick Nielsen – lead guitar, backing vocals
 Tom Petersson – bass guitar, backing vocals, lead vocals on "I Know What I Want"
 Bun E. Carlos – drums, percussion

Additional musicians
 Jai Winding – organ, piano, keyboards, Synth
Steve Lukather – guitar on "Voices"

Technical
 Tom Werman – producer
 Gary Ladinsky, Mike Beiriger – engineers
 Ken Adamany – assistant engineer
 George Marino – mastering
 Steve Dessau, Paula Scher – design
 Reid Miles – photography

Chart performance

Album

2017 reissue

Year-end charts

Certifications

References

1979 albums
Cheap Trick albums
Epic Records albums
Albums produced by Tom Werman
Albums recorded at Record Plant (Los Angeles)